Palladium was an Australian band from Brisbane that was active from 1997 to 2003. The band consisted of members Chris Chalk (drums), Andrew Morris (guitar and vocals), Justin Sykes (bass) and Brant Ward (guitar and vocals).

Palladium released their debut EP, Hoarsey, in 2001. Their debut album, the obscurely named Sister Flute and the Sunday Best, was released later in the year. They released another EP, Everybody Loves New Fashion, in early 2003 and the title track reached No. 92 on the ARIA Top 100 Singles chart.

The band received significant national airplay on Triple J with songs such as "Hoarsey" and "Good Girls".

They played their last show in October 2003 after Ward had decided to part ways. Morris, Sykes and Chalk were already working together on a new project. The band were recording a new album at the time. In 2009 the material that the band was working on at the time of their break-up had remained unreleased.

Discography

Albums and EPs

Singles

References

External links

Australian indie rock groups